Kresge–Groth Building is a historic commercial building located in downtown Fort Wayne, Indiana. It was built in 1926, and is a three-story, three bay, Spanish Colonial Revival style brick building. The front facade features three round-topped wall arches and two-story engaged limestone columns.  The building originally housed the S. S. Kresge Company and after 1933 the Earl Groth Company.  It was occupied by from 1964 to 1971 by Walgreen Drug Store.

It was listed on the National Register of Historic Places in 1988.

References

Commercial buildings on the National Register of Historic Places in Indiana
Commercial buildings completed in 1926
Mission Revival architecture in Indiana
Buildings and structures in Fort Wayne, Indiana
National Register of Historic Places in Fort Wayne, Indiana
1926 establishments in Indiana